Pablo Hernández de Cos (born January 20, 1971) is a Spanish economist who serves as the 70th Governor of the Bank of Spain, as Chairman of the Basel Committee on Banking Supervision and as Chair of the Advisory Technical Committee of the European Systemic Risk Board.

Hernández de Cos is the second youngest governor since Spain's transition to democracy after José Ramón Álvarez Rendueles, who was appointed governor in 1978, at the age of 38.

Early life and education 
Hernández de Cos graduated in economic and business sciences from the CUNEF University (CUNEF) in 1993, in law from the National University of Distance Education the following year and obtained his PhD in economics from the Complutense University in 2004, whose thesis was directed by José Manuel González-Páramo. In 2009 he completed a management programme at the IESE Business School of the University of Navarra. He has been an associate lecturer at the Economics Department of Charles III University of Madrid and the IE Business School (IE).

Career 
Hernández de Cos joined the Bank of Spain in 1997 as economist of its research service. Between 2004 and 2007 he was advisor to the executive board of the European Central Bank. From 2015 he held the position of general director of the Directorate General of Economy and Statistics of the organization after the resignation of Luis Malo de Molina who had held the position since 1992.

On May 28, 2018, Hernández de Cos was proposed by the Spanish Government for the position of governor of the Bank of Spain, and on May 30 was appointed to the position effective June 11; when he made a promise before Felipe VI of Spain at a ceremony held at Palace of Zarzuela. His appointment was one of the last decisions of the Government of Mariano Rajoy before the vote of no confidence that was successful and resulted in the downfall of Rajoy's government.

The press has highlighted the technical nature of Hernández de Cos' profile, with no political past. The Ministry of Economy, following the announcement of his appointment, stressed that "he is an excellent candidate for the post of governor due to his great technical training, particularly in banking and monetary matters; his political independence; and his experience and prestige in the Bank of Spain and the European Central Bank." Unidos Podemos has described him as "a hawk, but with an impeccable technical profile and, at least, he knows economics." Hernández de Cos himself has publicly advocated for giving the Spanish parliament a greater role in the appointment of central bank chiefs and extending future governorship terms to eight years from six.

In March 2019, Hernández de Cos succeeded Stefan Ingves as chairman of the Basel Committee on Banking Supervision (BCBS) for a three-year term that can be renewed once. In July 2019, he was appointed Chair of the Advisory Technical Committee of the European Systemic Risk Board.

Other activities

International organizations 
 Financial Stability Institute (FSI), member of the advisory board (since 2019)
 European Central Bank (ECB), ex officio member of the governing council (since 2018)
 European Systemic Risk Board (ESRB), ex officio member (since 2018)
 Financial Stability Board (FSB), ex officio member (since 2018)
 International Monetary Fund (IMF), ex officio alternate member of the board of governors (since 2018)

Non-profit organizations 
 Center for Latin American Monetary Studies (CEMLA), member of the board of trustees (since 2018)
 Consejo Superior de Estadística de España, member
 Foundation for Applied Economics Studies, member of the board of trustees and executive commission
 Centro de Estudios Monetarios y Financieros (CEMFI), member of the board of trustees (2015–2018)

References

External links 

CV in the Bank of Spain website
Images in Bank of Spain's Flickr account
Pablo Herández de Cos in the IDEAS-RePEc database

Spanish economists
Governors of the Bank of Spain
1971 births
Living people
Complutense University of Madrid alumni